"The Germans" (named on some releases as "Fire Drill") is the sixth episode of the BBC sitcom Fawlty Towers. In the episode, while suffering the effects of concussion, Basil Fawlty repeatedly offends some German guests. Despite warning his staff "Don't mention the war", he keeps ignoring his own advice. His insults culminate in a goose-stepping impersonation of Adolf Hitler.

Plot
Sybil, in hospital for a few days, instructs Basil on several tasks he must do at the hotel, including running a required fire drill and hanging a moose head. At the hotel, Basil has a conversation with the senile Major Gowen, who tells a Test match anecdote whose in-character comic basis is to have him reject a racist term (Indians aren't "niggers"), only to unexpectedly replace it with another (Indians are "wogs"). The Major also expresses his dislike of Germans when Basil tells him a German group is due the next day. Basil then has several pratfalls with Manuel while trying to hang the moose head, including many calls from Sybil reminding him to do so. At one point, he leaves the head on the hotel counter to get a hammer, during which Manuel practises his English from behind the counter; a confused Major thinks the moose head is talking.

The next morning Basil successfully mounts the head. After another call from Sybil, Basil prepares to start the fire drill, but ends up creating confusion with the guests between the fire alarm and the burglar alarm (with the fire alarm being "a semitone higher" than the burglar alarm). Matters are made worse when Manuel actually causes a fire in the kitchen, setting off the alarm, but Basil, unaware of this, assures the guests it is only a drill. After starting the alarm, he tries to use the extinguisher on the fire, which bursts and sprays him in the face, blinding him. Manuel races out of the kitchen and tries to help Basil, only to accidentally knock him out with a frying pan.

Basil wakes up in hospital after suffering concussion, and Sybil attests to Dr Finn that Basil cannot cope with the hotel alone. Basil sneaks out and returns to Fawlty Towers in time to greet the German guests. Despite telling everyone not to "mention the war", due to a combination of his own animosity and concussion-induced mental confusion, Basil makes numerous World War II references whilst taking their dinner orders and begins arguing with them, calling out Nazi Germany and frequently referring to Adolf Hitler and others. Polly discreetly calls the hospital to warn them about Basil's behaviour.

As one of the Germans breaks down into tears, Basil starts into war jokes and mocks Hitler's goose-stepping. Dr Finn arrives, prompting Basil to try to escape, Manuel giving chase. However, Basil hits the wall where he hung the moose head, which falls, knocks Basil out again, and lands on Manuel's head. As the Germans look on in disbelief, the Major comes out and thinks the moose is speaking to him again. The Germans ask aloud how the British could have won the war.

Cast
Episode-credited cast:
 John Cleese as Basil Fawlty
 Prunella Scales as Sybil Fawlty
 Andrew Sachs as Manuel
 Connie Booth as Polly Sherman
 Ballard Berkeley as Major Gowen
 Gilly Flower as Miss Abitha Tibbs
 Renee Roberts as Miss Ursula Gatsby
With:
 Lisa Bergmayr as German Guest
 Willy Bowman as German Guest
 Brenda Cowling as Sister
 Claire Davenport as Miss Wilson
 Iris Fry as Mrs. Sharp
 Dan Gillan as German Guest
 Nick Kane as German Guest
 John Lawrence as Mr. Sharp
 Louis Mahoney as Doctor Finn

Production
Interior scenes of this episode were recorded on 31 August 1975, in Studio TC6 of the BBC Television Centre, before a live audience.
This was the only episode not to begin with an exterior shot of the hotel. Instead, an exterior shot of the Northwick Park Hospital in Brent was used.
 In the scene where Manuel attempts to put out a fire in the kitchen, firemen were on standby to put out the flames. However, in the next shot where Manuel walks out to alert Basil of the fire, two chemicals were added to his arm, to create smoke. During rehearsal and filming these chemicals soaked into his clothing, causing Andrew Sachs second degree chemical burns on his arm and back.

Cultural impact
 In 1997, "The Germans" was ranked No. 12 on TV Guides 100 Greatest Episodes of All Time.
 This episode popularised the phrase "Don't mention the war". Cleese turned the phrase into a song for the 2006 FIFA World Cup, the first time Cleese had played Basil Fawlty in 27 years. The phrase was used as a title for a humorous travel book written by Stewart Ferris and Paul Bassett, detailing travels through Germany and other European countries. It is also the title of a book by John Ramsden, published in 2006, which examines Anglo-German relations since 1890, and a 2005 Radio 4 documentary looking at the British perception of Germans.
 The episode was one of the most popular of the series in Germany when it was first shown there in 1993.
 This episode was voted as number 11 in Channel 4's One Hundred Greatest TV Moments in 1999.
 Gold, a channel that regularly shows Fawlty Towers, argues that while "The Germans" is the most famous episode, the best episode is "Communication Problems".
 Empire magazine listed this as the best episode of the show in its list of the 50 greatest TV episodes of all time.
 In the first episode of the second series of the BBC series The Office, David Brent performs an impression of a paper industry figure as Basil Fawlty, quoting the phrase "Don't mention the war", and impersonating the goosestep used by Basil.
 The American film director Martin Scorsese has cited this as his favourite episode of Fawlty Towers.

Controversy
"The Germans" has been evaluated by critics in the context of stoking anti-German sentiment. Journalist Mark Lawson expressed the view that, "while the show will never win a prize for encouraging Anglo-German cultural understanding, Cleese is comically depicting – rather than politically promoting – fear of 'Fritz' ". In response to critics, John Cleese stated that his intention in writing this episode was "to make fun of English Basil Fawltys who are buried in the past" and "to make fun of the British obsession with the Second World War". 

In 2013, the BBC edited the Major's use of racial slurs from a repeat transmission of the episode, prompting some criticism by viewers. The BBC defended its decision: "We are very proud of Fawlty Towers and its contribution to British television comedy. But public attitudes have changed significantly since it was made and it was decided to make some minor changes, with the consent of John Cleese's management, to allow the episode to transmit to a family audience at 7.30pm on BBC2." However, on 28 June 2013, Gold transmitted the unedited episode after the watershed.

The episode was removed from the UKTV streaming service on 11 June 2020 in the wake of the George Floyd protests, with the other episodes of Fawlty Towers remaining available on the service. Cleese spoke against the removal of the episode due to the Major's use of racial slurs: "The Major was an old fossil left over from decades before. We were not supporting his views, we were making fun of them. If they can't see that, if people are too stupid to see that, what can one say?" On 13 June it was reinstated by UKTV with a warning about "offensive content and language".

References

Further reading
 Fawlty Towers: A Worshipper's Companion, Leo Publishing, 
 The Complete Fawlty Towers by John Cleese & Connie Booth (1988, Methuen, London)  (the complete text)

External links

Fawlty Towers episodes
1975 British television episodes
Germany–United Kingdom relations
Race-related controversies in television
Television controversies in the United Kingdom